Unia, released on 25 May 2007, is the fifth full-length studio album by the power metal band Sonata Arctica, following the album Reckoning Night. The first single from the album was "Paid in Full", released on 27 April 2007. This is also the last album that features Jani Liimatainen, who was later replaced by Elias Viljanen after the album was released.

The album was mixed at Finnvox Studios, and mastered at Cutting Room Studios in Stockholm, Sweden. The album was also released as a limited edition noble book in 7" size (1000 copies), exclusively available via mailorder from Nuclear Blast records. The limited edition came with a differing track listing and bonus tracks "To Create a Warlike Feel" and "Out in the Fields".

Sound and themes
Unia is darker and more aggressive than Sonata Arctica's earlier work, with mid-tempo songs, more inclusion of 7 string guitars and a minimal amount of solos. It has been described as a significant "turning point".

Vocalist Tony Kakko has once admitted that Unia being released just after Reckoning Night "was probably a shock to many people". He also described it as "a liberating experience. From there we took slowly some other direction". Commenting further on the album, he also stated:

Drummer and founding member Tommy Portimo said that Unia "brought many good things. I think our band needed that little shaking. [...] That album felt very natural. Although we realized it was very far from what we were before. But it was just a natural shaking."

The track "Caleb" continues what the band refers to as "the so-called Caleb saga", a series of songs that started on Silence's "The End of This Chapter" and is continued on Reckoning Night's "Don't Say a Word", The Days of Grays's "Juliet"; The Ninth Hour's "Till Death's Done Us Apart" and Talviyö's "The Last of the Lambs".

Track listing

Personnel
Sonata Arctica
Tony Kakko − vocals, additional keyboards
Jani Liimatainen − guitars, acoustic guitars (on tracks 11, 14)
Marko Paasikoski − bass guitar
Henrik Klingenberg − lead keyboards, hammond organ, piano (on track 2)
Tommy Portimo − drums

Additional personnel
Selestina Choir on "In Black and White", "Under Your Tree", "To Create a Warlike Feel" and "Caleb" conducted by Tarja Vanhala.
Acoustic guitars, Bouzouki, Chromaharp, Cavaquinho and Q-chord on "They Follow", "Under Your Tree", "The Harvest", "It Won't Fade" and "Fly With the Black Swan" by Peter Engberg.
Finnish vocals in "To Create a Warlike Feel" by Jarkko Martikainen
Opening narration in "Caleb" by Milla V
Vocals, "whatevergod..." ("Caleb") and backing vocals, "just passion and rage" ("In Black and White") performed by Starbuck.

String orchestra on "Good Enough Is Good Enough"
 Tuomas Airola − cello
 Elar Kuiv − violin
 Kati Niemelä − violin/viola
 Anna-Leena Kangas − viola
 Oskari Hannula − double bass
 Bowed string instruments arranged and conducted by Tuomas Airola.

Charts

Certifications

References

Sonata Arctica albums
2007 albums
Nuclear Blast albums